Avax may refer to:
Avax Technologies, an American bio-tech company
AVAX is the native token of Avalanche blockchain
Gradient Avax, a Czech paraglider design
J&P-AVAX, a Greek construction company and subsidiary of Joannou & Paraskevaides